Sandeep Pathak is an Indian film, television and theatre actor in Marathi and Hindi Language. He has featured in television shows such as Asambhav, Eka Lagnachi Dusri Goshta. He also has films like Harishchandrachi Factory, Ek Hazarachi Note, Rangaa Patangaa, Poshter Girl, Idak to his credit. He is also known for his work in theatre with plays such as Varhad Nighalay Londonla, Sakharam Binder, Asami Asa Mi, Vyakti Aani Valli. He has done many comedy shows like - Hasa Chakat Fu, Fu Bai Fu and Comedy Express.

Career
Pathak started his career in Marathi theatre. The stage play Varhad Nighalay Londonla had him in a lead role.

His debut film was Shwaas. His recently released films such as Rangaa Patangaa, Double Seat, and Poshter Girl.

Filmography

Awards Received

 Maharashtra State Award for Best Actor - Ek Hajarachi Note 
 Maharashtra State Award for Best Actor - Ranga Patanga 
 Maharashtra Times Sanman Award for Best Actor - Ek Hajarachi Note 
 Baban Prabhu Award - Varhad Nighalay Londonla 
 Dadasaheb Phalake Film Festival Award - Ranga Patanga

Personal life
Born at Majalgaon, (District) Beed on 14th May, 1978. He completed his graduation in Bachelor of Arts (Drama), from SB College, Aurangabad and attained Master of Arts (Drama) from Lalit Kala Kendra at University of Pune. Sandeep married in 2005 with Kalpana Pathak. The couple has two children Nishad and Swara.

References

External links

Marathi actors
Year of birth missing (living people)
Living people